Little River (formerly known as Littleriver, Bell's Harbor, and Kent's Landing) is a small census-designated place in Mendocino County, California, United States. The town takes its name from the nearby Little River. The town center sits on a scenic bluff overlooking the mouth of the Little River and hosts a grocery store, two gas pumps, a post office, and a restaurant within a single structure. The population was 94 at the 2020 census, down from 117 at the 2010 census.

Economy
Little River is home to several boutique inns and bed & breakfasts, making it a popular tourist stop along the Pacific Coast. The Little River area has two state parks, much ocean access and diverse recreational opportunities including ocean kayaking, hiking, and canoeing.

The ZIP Code is 95456. The community is inside area code 707.

History

Little River was first settled by three Beall men (pronounced Bell). They are thought to have arrived between 1852 and 1856 and are listed on the 1860 Mendocino County census, Big River township: Lloyd (56 years, a farmer born in Tennessee), Samuel (26 years, a farmer born in Missouri), and Harvey (24 years, a stock man born in Missouri). The Bealls joined the Moore Brothers who had preempted land and erected dwellings a short distance from the ocean north of the bay. Shortly after, in 1856, W.H. Kent purchased the Beall tract. The place was known as "Beall's Harbor" and "Kent's Landing" until 1864, when the name was changed to "Littleriver Bay". Ruel Stickney, Silas Coombs, and Tapping Reeves built a mill here, which provided the stimulus for the formation of the town of Little River. The town grew with the success of the mill so that eventually a schoolhouse, post house, shipyard, hotels, stores and blacksmith shops all established themselves here.

Little River prospered in a similar way to many other towns on the Mendocino Coast until the nearby inland timber stands faltered. In the case of Little River, the mill closed in 1893. The loss of the mill shrunk the town, and since that time it has served mainly as a tourist destination due to its beaches and Van Damme State Park, which the Little River runs through. The first road that ran through this area was the Anderson Valley and Big River Wagon Road. This road was likely widened and altered over the years until it was eventually added to the State Highway System.

The Little River post office opened in 1865, changed its name to Littleriver in 1894, closed in 1929, and re-opened as Little River in 1930.

Geography
The Little River passes through the northern part of the community, emptying into the Pacific Ocean at Van Damme Beach, part of Van Damme State Park, which extends east from the beach up the Little River valley, known as Fern Canyon.

Demographics

The 2010 United States Census reported that Little River had a population of 117. The racial makeup of Little River was 113 (96.6%) White, 0 (0.0%) African American, 1 (0.9%) Native American, 0 (0.0%) Asian, 0 (0.0%) Pacific Islander, 0 (0.0%) from other races, and 3 (2.6%) from two or more races. Hispanic or Latino of any race were 2 persons (1.7%).

The Census reported that 117 people (100% of the population) lived in households, 0 (0%) lived in non-institutionalized group quarters, and 0 (0%) were institutionalized.

There were 69 households, out of which 6 (8.7%) had children under the age of 18 living in them, 25 (36.2%) were opposite-sex married couples living together, 3 (4.3%) had a female householder with no husband present, 1 (1.4%) had a male householder with no wife present.  There were 4 (5.8%) unmarried opposite-sex partnerships, and 0 (0%) same-sex married couples or partnerships. 35 households (50.7%) were made up of individuals, and 14 (20.3%) had someone living alone who was 65 years of age or older. The average household size was 1.70.  There were 29 families (42.0% of all households); the average family size was 2.38.

The population was spread out, with 11 people (9.4%) under the age of 18, 5 people (4.3%) aged 18 to 24, 23 people (19.7%) aged 25 to 44, 49 people (41.9%) aged 45 to 64, and 29 people (24.8%) who were 65 years of age or older.  The median age was 54.7 years. For every 100 females, there were 98.3 males.  For every 100 females age 18 and over, there were 92.7 males.

The homeowner vacancy rate was 7.0%; the rental vacancy rate was 6.5%.  67 people (57.3% of the population) lived in owner-occupied housing units and 50 people (42.7%) lived in rental housing units.

Politics

In popular culture
The Heritage House Inn, a bed and breakfast between Little River and Albion, was the location for the film Same Time, Next Year (1978), starring Alan Alda and Ellen Burstyn. The town itself appears in several scenes of The Dunwich Horror (1970).

See also
Little River Inn
Rachel Binah

References

Populated coastal places in California
Census-designated places in Mendocino County, California
Census-designated places in California
1856 establishments in California